Rod Jackson may refer to:

Rod Jackson (musician)
Rod Jackson (politician)
Rod Jackson (rugby league)
Rod Jackson (epidemiologist)